China has qualified to send athletes to the 2016 Summer Paralympics in Rio de Janeiro, Brazil, from 7 September to 18 September 2016.  Sports China competed in include blind football, archery, boccia, cycling, goalball, judo, paracanoeing, sitting volleyball and wheelchair basketball.

Disability classifications

Every participant at the Paralympics has their disability grouped into one of five disability categories; amputation, the condition may be congenital or sustained through injury or illness; cerebral palsy; wheelchair athletes, there is often overlap between this and other categories; visual impairment, including blindness; Les autres, any physical disability that does not fall strictly under one of the other categories, for example dwarfism or multiple sclerosis. Each Paralympic sport then has its own classifications, dependent upon the specific physical demands of competition. Events are given a code, made of numbers and letters, describing the type of event and classification of the athletes competing. Some sports, such as athletics, divide athletes by both the category and severity of their disabilities, other sports, for example swimming, group competitors from different categories together, the only separation being based on the severity of the disability.

Medalists
The following Chinese competitors won medals at the Games.

|  style="text-align:left; width:78%; vertical-align:top;"|

* – Indicates ①track&field athlete only sign up in the heats, but not ran in the final race.②swimming athlete only swam in the heats but not in the final race.③archer athlete only shoot in the ranking round, but not in the Olympic rounds.

|  style="text-align:left; width:22%; vertical-align:top;"|

5-a-side football 

China qualified for the Paralympics after finishing second at the 2015 IBSA Blind Football Aaian Championships.

Rosters
Coach:,
Guide:

Group B

Semi-final

Bronze-medal match

Archery

With the  2015 World Archery Para Championships serving as a Paralympic qualifying event, several Chinese archers assisted the country in earning spots for Rio. This included the Chinese recurve open mixed team,  and China's W1 pair claimed the first two spots for China at the event. Yu He and Zhao Lixue claimed the maximum two spots per nation for China in the recurve men's open event. Gao Fangxia claimed a spot for China as a result of her win in the women's Paralympic secondary tournament. China claimed a pair of spots in the  mixed team compound open event after one of their teams set a world record of  157 points on their way to claiming gold in the finals.  Zhou Jiamin earned China an additional spot with her sixth-place finish in the women's event. China earned a pair of spots in the  W1 women's event after Guo Ying won gold and Zhang Lu finished fourth.
Men

|-
|align=left|Ai Xinliang
|align=left rowspan=2|Men's individual compound open
|668
|14
|W 143-135 
|W 138-134
|W 142-138
|L 144-146
|L 142-145
|4
|-
|align=left|Cao Hanwen
|666
|16
|L 142-143
|colspan=5 
|-
|align=left|Liu Huanan
|align=left rowspan=1|Men's individual compound W1
|475
|15
|L 84-142
|colspan=5 
|-
|align=left|Shi Xucheng
|align=left rowspan=3|Men's individual recurve open
|602
|14
|W 7-1
|L 3-7
|colspan=4 
|-
|align=left|Yu He
|583
|21
|W 7-3
|L 0-6
|colspan=4 
|-
|align=left|Zhao Lixue
|609
|11
|W 6-0 
|L 4-6
|colspan=4 
|}

Women

|-
|align=left|Lin Dandan
|align=left rowspan=3|Women's Individual Recurve Open
|618
|5
| L 3-7
|colspan=5 
|-
|align=left|Wu Chunyan
|637
|1
| W 6-0
| W 7-3
| W 6-4
| W 7-1
| L 4-6
|
|-
|align=left|Ye Jinyan
|622
|3
| W 7-1 
|L 2-6
|colspan=4 
|-
|align=left|Lin Yueshan
|align=left rowspan=2|Women's Individual Compound Open
|651
|6
|
| W 141-130  
| W 141-139
| W 137-129
| L 138-138
|
|-
|align=left|Zhou Jiamin
|674
|1
|
| W 144-136 
| W 144-132
| W 138-132
| W 138-138
|
|-
|align=left|Lu Liang
|align=left rowspan=1|Women's individual compound W1
|598
|4
|
|
| L 128-130 
|colspan=3 
|}
Mixed

|-
|align=left|Wu ChunyanZhao LixueShi Xucheng*Lin Dandan*Yu He*Ye Jinyan*
|align=left|Team Recurve Open
|1246
|2
|
|W 6-0
|W 6-0
| W 6-0
| W 5-3
|
|-
|align=left|Ai XinliangZhou JiaminCao Hanwen*Lin Yueshan*
|align=left|Team Compound Open
|1342
|2
|
|
|W 155-143
|W 149-139
|W 151-143
|
|-
|align=left|Liu HuananLu Liang
|align=left|Team Compound W1
|1073
|7
|colspan=2 
|L 95-137
|colspan=3 
|}
* – Indicates athlete only shoot in the Ranking Round but not in the Olympic Rounds.

Athletics

T/F 11-13

Men's Track

Men's Field

Women's Track

Women's Field

T/F 31-38

Men's Track

Men's Field

Women's Track

Women's Field

F40-41

Men's Field

Women's Field

T/F 42-47

Men's Track

Men's Field

Women's Track

Women's Field

T/F 51-58

Men's Track

Men's Field

Women's Track

Women's Field

Qualifiers for the latter rounds (Q or q) of track events were decided on time, therefore positions shown are results versus competitors in their own heats.
* – Indicates athlete only sign up in the heats but not ran in the final race.

Boccia 

China qualified for the 2016 Summer Paralympics in this sport at the Hong Kong hosted 2015 BISFed Asia and Oceania Boccia Team and Pairs Championships in the BC4 Pair event.  They claimed gold ahead of silver medalist South Korea and bronze medalists Hong Kong. They blanked South Korea 5 - 0 in the gold medal game. The pair team included Yuansen Zheng and ximei Lin, and they were ranked second in the world at the time. They entered qualification as the number two seed in Asia in their event, behind eventual bronze medalists Hong Kong who were then ranked third in the world.
Individual

Pairs

Teams

Cycling 

With one pathway for qualification being one highest ranked NPCs on the UCI Para-Cycling male and female Nations Ranking Lists on 31 December 2014, China qualified for the 2016 Summer Paralympics in Rio, assuming they continued to meet all other eligibility requirements.

Track
Time Trial

Individual Pursuit

Sprint

Road
Time Trial

Road Race

Goalball

Men 
The China men's national goalball team qualified for the Rio Games after finishing first at the 2015 IBSA Goalball Asian-Pacific Championships. China's men enter the tournament ranked 3rd in the world.

Rosters

Group B

Quarter-finals

Women 
China's women enter the tournament ranked 1st in the world.

Rosters

Group D

Quarter-finals

Semi-finals

Gold-medal match

Judo 

With one pathway for qualification being having a top finish at the 2014 IBSA Judo World Championships, China earned a qualifying spot in Rio base on the performance of Liqing Li in the women's -48 kg event.  The B2 Judoka finished first in her class. Yanping Yuan earned China a second spot with her gold medal in the women's +70 kg event.

Paracanoeing

China earned a qualifying spot at the 2016 Summer Paralympics in this sport following their performance at the 2015 ICF Canoe Sprint & Paracanoe World Championships in Milan, Italy where the top six finishers in each Paralympic event earned a qualifying spot for their nation. Danqin Wang earned the spot for China after finishing seventh in the women's KL2 event because Great Britain had two people in the top six but could only get one bearth.

Powerlifting

China is competing at powerlifting in Rio.
Men

Women

Rowing

Sitting volleyball

Men 
China men's national sitting volleyball team qualified for the 2016 Summer Paralympics at the 2014 Asian Para Games, winning the gold-medal match in sets of 25-12, 25-20, 29-27 against the Iran men's national sitting volleyball team.

Rosters

Group B

Classification 7th / 8th

Women 
China women's national sitting volleyball team qualified to compete at the 2016 Games after finishing first at the 2014 World Championships.  Later that year, the team competed in the 2014 Asian Para Games where they lost to Iran women's national sitting volleyball team in the final with sets of 25-15, 25-12, and 25-15 in Iran's favor.

Rosters

Group B

Semi-finals

Final

Shooting 

The first opportunity to qualify for shooting at the Rio Games took place at the 2014 IPC Shooting World Championships in Suhl. Shooters earned spots for their NPC.  China  earned a qualifying spot at this event in the R8 – 50m rifle 3 positions women SH1 event as a result of Cuiping Zhang winning a gold medal. China qualified a pair of shooters in the P3 – 25m Pistol Mixed SH1 event based on the performances of Jianfei Li and Hedong Ni. Cuiping Zhang grabbed the fourth qualifying spot for China at this competition in the R6 – 50m Rifle Prone Mixed SH1 event.

The country sent shooters to 2015 IPC IPC Shooting World Cup in Osijek, Croatia, where Rio direct qualification was also available.  They earned a qualifying spot at this event based on the performance of Yaping Yan in the R3 – 10m Air Rifle Prone Mixed SH1 event. Chao Yang earned China a second spot at the event in the P1 – 10m Air Pistol Men SH1 event.  Xing Huang's performance gave China its third and final qualifying spot at this competition with his finish in the P3 – 25m Pistol Mixed SH1.

The third opportunity for direct qualification for shooters to the Rio Paralympics took place at the 2015 IPC IPC Shooting World Cup in Sydney, Australia.  At this competition, Dingchao Gou earned a qualifying spot for their country in the R1 - Men's 10m Air Rifle Standing SH1  event. Xiao Hong Bai earned a second spot for China at this event based on her performance in the R2 - Women's 10m Air Rifle Standing SH1  event. Huan He had China's third spot earned for Rio at this competition with her performance in the R3 - Mixed 10m Air Rifle Prone SH1 event. Hongxiang Yuan grabbed a fourth spot for China in the R4- Mixed 10m Air Rifle Standing SH2 event.
Men

Women

Mixed

Swimming 

The top two finishers in each Rio medal event at the 2015 IPC Swimming World Championships earned a qualifying spot for their country for Rio. Shiyun Pan earned China a spot after winning gold in the Men's 100m Freestyle S7.

Men

Women

Mixed

Qualifiers for the latter rounds (Q or q) of all events were decided on a time only basis, therefore positions shown are results versus competitors in their own heats.
* – Indicates athlete swam in the heats but not in the final race.

Table tennis 

Men's individual

Men's team

Women's individual

Women's team

Wheelchair basketball

The China women's national wheelchair basketball team has qualified for the 2016 Rio Paralympics.

As hosts, Brazil got to choose which group they were put into.  They were partnered with Algeria, who would be put in the group they did not chose.  Brazil chose Group A, which included Canada, Germany, Great Britain and Argentina.  Algeria ended up in Group B with the United States, the Netherlands, France and China.

Rosters

Group B

Quarter-final

5th/6th place playoff

Wheelchair fencing 

Men

Women

Wheelchair tennis 
China qualified two competitors in the men's single event. Zujun Wei qualified through the standard route. Dong Shunjiang qualified via a Doubles World Ranking Allocation place.  China qualified two players in the women's singles event. Zhenzhen Zhu qualified via the standard route.  Hui Min Huang earned a spot via a Bipartite Commission Invitation place.

See also
China at the 2016 Summer Olympics

References

Nations at the 2016 Summer Paralympics
2016
2016 in Chinese sport